Tualau Fale (born 12 November 1960) is a Tongan boxer. He competed in the men's heavyweight event at the 1988 Summer Olympics and lost his first bout to Harold Obunga of Kenya.

References

External links
 

1960 births
Living people
Heavyweight boxers
Tongan male boxers
Olympic boxers of Tonga
Boxers at the 1988 Summer Olympics
Commonwealth Games competitors for Tonga
Boxers at the 1990 Commonwealth Games
Place of birth missing (living people)